Duboki Potok, which translates as Deep Stream from Serbo-Croatian,  may refer to:

 Duboki Potok (Ilijaš), a village in Bosnia and Herzegovina
 Duboki Potok (Srebrenik), a village in Bosnia and Herzegovina
 Duboki Potok Monastery, a monastery in the Eparchy of Raška and Prizren, Kosovo